Kavaklı is a village in the central district of Hakkâri Province in Turkey. The village is populated by Kurds of the Ertoşî tribe and moreover Kurds with a non-tribal background. The village had a population of 130 in 2022.

The four hamlets of Armutlu, Çaltepe, Çeltik and Mezra are attached to Kavaklı.

History 
Portions of the non-tribal Kurdish population from Kavaklı migrated to neighboring Yoncalı.

Population 
Population history from 2007 to 2022:

References 

Villages in Hakkâri District
Kurdish settlements in Hakkâri Province